Bullen's Animal World was a circus style theme park located at Wallacia on the outskirts of Sydney.  Its address was 11 Park Road, Wallacia.  An equivalent one also existed at Wanneroo Lion Park in Wanneroo in Perth.

Background
It was opened in 1969 by Stafford Bullen, the son of circus founder Alfred Percival Bullen, and operated until 1985.  Its closure was to foreshadow the closure of Bullen's other nearby venture, the African Lion Safari, in 1991.

Zambi Wildlife Retreat
Zambi Wildlife Retreat is a animal welfare charity that operates at the former site of the Bullen's property and adopted some of the Bullen's former animals.  It focuses on rescuing captive wild animals such as lions, tigers, hamadryas baboons, common marmosets, meerkats, hyacinth macaw, blue-and-gold macaw, dingoes, wolfdogs and until recently the last puma held in Australia. 'Zambi' is open to visitors by appointment and offers feeding and interaction opportunities.

References

External links
 News story about two chimpanzees from the park
 Obituary of Stafford Bullen, originally published in the Sydney Morning Herald, 12 January 2001

1969 establishments in Australia
1986 disestablishments in Australia
Defunct amusement parks in Australia
Amusement parks opened in 1969
Amusement parks closed in 1986